The phrase straw bear may refer to the following:
 Straw Bear, an American racehorse
 The Whittlesea Straw Bear, a revival of a traditional seasonal custom in the UK. The name is also used for the festival at which the straw bear now appears
 Straw bear (German traditional character), traditional characters in seasonal rituals and processions in parts of Germany